Equal representation can refer to several topics in democracies:

Representation (politics), the methods by which people are represented
Apportionment (politics), the way that representatives are assigned to voting groups, with equal representation meaning that all groups are fairly represented
One man, one vote, the principle that each vote must have equal value